Shaolin Kung Fu, also called Shaolin Wushu, or Shaolin quan, is one of the oldest, largest, and most famous styles of wushu, or kung fu of Chan Buddhism. It combines Ch'an philosophy and martial arts and originated and was developed in the Shaolin Temple in Henan province, Greater China during its 1500-year history. Popular sayings in Chinese folklore related to this practice include "All martial arts under heaven originated from Shaolin" and "Shaolin kung fu is the best under heaven," indicating the influence of Shaolin kung fu among martial arts. The name Shaolin is also used as a brand for the so-called external styles of kung fu. Many styles in southern and northern China use the name Shaolin.

History

Chinese martial arts before Shaolin
Chinese historical records, like Spring and Autumn Annals of Wu and Yue, the Bibliographies in the Book of the Han Dynasty, the Records of the Grand Historian, and other sources document the existence of martial arts in China for thousands of years. For example, the Chinese martial art of wrestling, Shuai Jiao, predates the establishment of Shaolin temple by several centuries. Since Chinese monasteries were large landed estates, sources of considerable regular income, monks required protection. Historical discoveries indicate that, even before the establishment of Shaolin temple, monks had arms and also practiced martial arts. In 1784 the Boxing Classic: Essential Boxing Methods made the earliest extant reference to the Shaolin Monastery as Chinese boxing's place of origin. This is, however, a misconception, but shows the historical importance of Shaolin kung fu.

Southern and Northern dynasties (420–589 AD)

Shaolin temple established

In 495 AD, Shaolin temple was built among the Song mountains in Henan province. The first monk who preached Buddhism there was the Indian monk named Buddhabhadra, simply called Batuo by the Chinese. There are historical records that Batuo's first Chinese disciples, Huiguang and Sengchou, both had exceptional martial skills. For example, Sengchou's skill with the tin staff is even documented in the Chinese Buddhist canon. After Buddhabadra, the monk Bodhidharma, described as either Central Asian or South Asian (Indian) and simply called Damo by the Chinese, came to Shaolin in 527 AD. His Chinese disciple, Huike, was also a highly trained martial arts expert. There are hints that these first three Chinese Shaolin monks, Huiguang, Sengchou, and Huike, may have been military men before entering the monastic life.

Bodhidharma's influence

Bodhidharma is traditionally credited as the transmitter of Chan Buddhism to China, and regarded as its first Chinese patriarch. In Japan, he is known as Daruma.

The idea that Bodhidharma founded martial arts at the Shaolin Temple was spread in the 20th century, however, this idea came from a debunked apocryphal 17th century legend that claimed Bodhidharma began the physical training of the monks of Shaolin Monastery that led to the creation of Shaolin kung fu. The idea of Bodhidharma influencing Shaolin boxing is based on a Qigong manual written during the 17th century. This is when a Taoist with the pen name 'Purple Coagulation Man of the Way' wrote the Sinews Changing Classic in 1624, but claimed to have discovered it. The first of two prefaces of the manual traces this succession from Bodhidharma to the Chinese general Li Jing via "a chain of Buddhist saints and martial heroes." The work itself is full of anachronistic mistakes and even includes a popular character from Chinese fiction, the 'Qiuran Ke' ('Bushy Bearded Hero'), as a lineage master. Scholar-officials as far back as the Qing dynasty have taken note of these mistakes. The scholar Ling Tinkang (1757–1809) described the author as an "ignorant village master." Even then, the association of Bodhidharma with martial arts only became widespread as a result of the 1904–1907 serialization of the novel The Travels of Lao Ts'an in Illustrated Fiction Magazine:

Sui and Tang dynasties (581–907 AD): Shaolin soldier monks
During the short period of the Sui dynasty (581–618), the building blocks of Shaolin kung fu took an official form, and Shaolin monks began to create fighting systems of their own. The 18 methods of Luohan with a strong Buddhist flavour were practiced by Shaolin monks since this time, which was later used to create more advanced Shaolin martial arts. Shaolin monks had developed very powerful martial skills, and this showed itself towards the end of the Sui dynasty.

Like most dynastic changes, the end of the Sui dynasty was a time of upheaval and contention for the throne. The oldest evidence of Shaolin participation in combat is a stele from 728 that attests to two occasions: a defense of the monastery from bandits around 610 and their role in the defeat of Wang Shichong at the Battle of Hulao in 621. Wang Shichong declared himself Emperor. He controlled the territory of Zheng and the ancient capital of Luoyang. Overlooking Luoyang on Mount Huanyuan was the Cypress Valley Estate, which had served as the site of a fort during the Jin and a commandery during the Southern Qi. Emperor Wen of Sui had bestowed the estate on a nearby monastery called Shaolin for its monks to farm, but Wang Shichong, realizing its strategic value, seized the estate and there placed troops and a signal tower, as well as establishing a prefecture called Yuanzhou. Furthermore, he had assembled an army at Luoyang to march on the Shaolin Temple itself.

The monks of Shaolin allied with Wang's enemy, Li Shimin, and took back the Cypress Valley Estate, defeating Wang's troops and capturing his nephew Renze. Without the fort at Cypress Valley, there was nothing to keep Li Shimin from marching on Luoyang after his defeat of Wang's ally Dou Jiande at the Battle of Hulao, forcing Wang Shichong to surrender. Li Shimin's father was the first Tang Emperor and Shimin himself became its second. Thereafter Shaolin enjoyed the royal patronage of the Tang.

Though the Shaolin Monastery Stele of 728 attests to these incidents in 610 and 621 when the monks engaged in combat, it does not allude to martial training in the monastery, or to any fighting technique in which its monks specialized. Nor do any other sources from the Tang, Song and Yuan periods allude to military training at the temple. According to Meir Shahar, this is explained by a confluence of the late Ming fashion for military encyclopedias and, more importantly, the conscription of civilian irregulars, including monks, as a result of Ming military decline in the 16th century.
Stele and documentary evidence shows the monks historically worshiped the Bodhisattva Vajrapani's "Kinnara King" form as the progenitor of their staff and bare hand fighting styles.

Ming dynasty (1368–1644)
From the 8th to the 15th centuries, no extant source documents Shaolin participation in combat; then the 16th and 17th centuries see at least forty extant sources attest that, not only did monks of Shaolin practice martial arts, but martial practice had become such an integral element of Shaolin monastic life that the monks felt the need to justify it by creating new Buddhist lore. References to Shaolin martial arts appear in various literary genres of the late Ming:
the epitaphs of Shaolin warrior monks, martial-arts manuals, military encyclopedias, historical writings, travelogues, fiction, and even poetry.

These sources, in contrast to those from the Tang dynasty period, refer to Shaolin methods of combat unarmed, with the spear, and with the weapon that was the forte of the Shaolin monks and for which they had become famous, the staff. By the mid-16th century military experts from all over Ming China were travelling to Shaolin to study its fighting techniques.

Around 1560 Yú Dàyóu travelled to Shaolin Monastery to see for himself its monks' fighting techniques, but found them disappointing. Yú returned to the south with two monks, Zongqing and Pucong, whom he taught the use of the staff over the next three years, after which Zongqing and Pucong returned to Shaolin Monastery and taught their brother monks what they had learned. Martial arts historian Tang Hao traced the Shaolin staff style Five Tigers Interception to Yú's teachings.

The earliest extant manual on Shaolin kung fu, the Exposition of the Original Shaolin Staff Method was written in around 1610 and published in 1621 from what its author Chéng Zōngyóu learned during a more than ten-year stay at the monastery.

Conditions of lawlessness in Henan—where the Shaolin Monastery is located—and surrounding provinces during the late Ming dynasty and all of the Qing dynasty contributed to the development of martial arts.
Meir Shahar lists the martial arts T'ai chi ch'uan, Chang Family Boxing, Bāguàquán, Xíngyìquán and Bajiquan as originating from this region and this time period.

Pirates

From the 1540s to the 1560s, pirates known as wokou raided China's eastern and southeastern coasts on an unprecedented scale.

The geographer Zheng Ruoceng provides the most detailed of the 16th-century sources which confirm that, in 1553, Wan Biao, Vice Commissioner in Chief of the Nanjing Chief Military Commission, initiated the conscription of monks—including some from Shaolin—against the pirates. Warrior monks participated in at least four battles: at the Gulf of Hangzhou in spring 1553 and in the Huangpu River delta at Wengjiagang in July 1553, Majiabang in spring 1554, and Taozhai in autumn 1555.

The monks suffered their greatest defeat at Taozhai, where four of them fell in battle; their remains were buried under the Stūpa of the Four Heroic Monks (Si yi seng ta) at Mount She near Shanghai.

The monks won their greatest victory at Wengjiagang. On 21 July 1553, 120 warrior monks led by the Shaolin monk Tianyuan defeated a group of pirates and chased the survivors over ten days and twenty miles. The pirates suffered over one hundred casualties and the monks only four.

Not all of the monks who fought at Wengjiagang were from Shaolin, and rivalries developed among them. Zheng chronicles Tianyuan's defeat of eight rival monks from Hangzhou who challenged his command. Zheng ranked Shaolin first of the top three Buddhist centers of martial arts. Zheng ranked Funiu in Henan second and Mount Wutai in Shanxi third. The Funiu monks practiced staff techniques which they had learned at the Shaolin Monastery. The Wutai monks practiced Yang Family Spear (楊家槍; pinyin: Yángjiā qiāng).

Contents

Shaolin temple has two main legacies: Chan, which refers to Chan Buddhism, the religion of Shaolin, and Quan, which refers to the martial arts of Shaolin. In Shaolin, these are not separate disciplines and monks have always pursued the philosophy of the unification of Chan and Quan. In a deeper point of view, Quan is considered part of Chan. As late Shaolin monk Suxi said in the last moments of his life, "Shaolin is Chan, not Quan."

On the Quan (martial) side, the contents are abundant. A usual classification of contents are:
 Basic skills: These include stamina, flexibility, and balance, which improve the body abilities in doing martial maneuvers. In Shaolin kung fu, flexibility and balance skills are known as "childish skill", which have been classified into 18 postures.
 Power skills: These include:
 Qigong meditation: Qigong meditation itself has two types, internal, which is stationary meditation, and external, which is dynamic meditation methods like Shaolin four-part exercise, eight-section brocade, Shaolin muscle-changing scripture, and others.
 The 72 arts: These Include 36 soft and 36 hard exercises, which are known as soft and hard qigong.
 Combat skills ("skills"): These include various barehanded, weapon, and barehanded vs. weapon routines (styles) and their combat methods.

Styles
Shaolin styles consist of many
different animal forms and techniques. Wing Chun is widely popular partly due to the Chinese made and produced hit movie series IP Man. Named for Bruce Lee’s first teacher of Wing Chun (Yip Man) the most famous practitioner of the art.

Like the usual system of Chinese martial arts, Shaolin combat methods are taught via forms. Forms that are technically closely related are coupled together and are considered of the same sub-style. These are usually called the small and the big forms, like the small and big hong quan, which altogether make the Shaolin hong quan style, and the small and big pao quan, etc. There are also some styles with one form, like taizu chang quan. Indeed, these styles are not complete or stand-alone, this is just a classification of different forms of Shaolin kung fu based on their technical contents.

Shaolin kung fu has more than hundreds of extant styles. There is recorded documentation of more than a thousand extant forms, which makes Shaolin the biggest school of martial art in the world. In the Qing dynasty (1644–1911), Shaolin monks chose 100 of the best styles of Shaolin kung fu. Then they shortlisted the 18 most famous of them. However, every lineage of Shaolin monks have always chosen their own styles. Every style teaches unique methods for fighting and keeping health via one or a few forms. To learn a complete system, Shaolin monks master a number of styles and weapons. The most famous styles of Shaolin kung fu are:

List of known styles
 Arhat's 18 hands: known as the oldest style.
 Flood style: with the small form known as the son of the styles, and the big form known as the mother of the styles,
 Explosive style: known as the king of the styles,
 Penetrating-Arms style,
 7-star & Long Guard the Heart and Mind Gate style,
 Plum Blossom style,
 Facing & Bright Sun style,
 Arhat style: known as the most representative style,
 Vajrapani style,
 Emperor's Long-range style: known as the most graceful style,
 6-Match style,
 Soft style,
 Mind style
 Imitative styles (including Dragon, Tiger, Leopard, Eagle, Monkey, Mantis, etc.),
 Drunken style,

and many other styles.

Internal and external kung fu
Huang Zongxi described martial arts in terms of Shaolin or "external" arts versus Wudang or internal arts in 1669. It has been since then that Shaolin has been popularly synonymous for what are considered the external Chinese martial arts, regardless of whether or not the particular style in question has any connection to the Shaolin Monastery. Some say that there is no differentiation between the so-called internal and external systems of the Chinese martial arts, while other well-known teachers hold the opinion that they are different. For example, the Taijiquan teacher Wu Jianquan:

Those who practice Shaolinquan leap about with strength and force; people not proficient at this kind of training soon lose their breath and are exhausted. Taijiquan is unlike this. Strive for quiescence of body, mind and intention.

Influence on other martial arts
Some lineages of karate have oral traditions that claim Shaolin origins. Martial arts traditions in Japan,
Korea, Sri Lanka and certain Southeast Asian countries cite Chinese influence as transmitted by Buddhist monks.

Recent developments in the 20th century such as Shorinji Kempo practised in Japan's Sohonzan Shorinji still maintains close ties with China's Song Shan Shaolin Temple due to historic links. Japanese Shorinji Kempo Group received recognition in China in 2003 for their financial contributions to the maintenance of the historic edifice of the Song Shan Shaolin Temple.

Popular culture
 Shang-Chi and the Legend of the Ten Rings features the title character using Shaolin Kung Fu.

Several films have been produced, particularly during the 70s and early 80s, about Shaolin kung fu. Films such as 36th Chamber of Shaolin, The Shaolin Temple, and Shaolin Wooden Men. Modern films include Shaolin Soccer and Shaolin.

Shaolin has influenced numerous rappers, notably the members of Wu Tang Clan.

Shaolin monks (referred to simply as “monks” in-game) appear in the roguelike game NetHack, along with samurai, they are one of the two roles to use martial arts skills, with monks having the most powerful martial arts skills in the game.

References

External links

Chinese martial arts
Buddhist martial arts
Shaolin Temple